Half Brother was an English pop rock band in the late 1970s, consisting of two half brothers, Howard Goodall and Jonathan Kermode.

Howard Goodall first conceived the band at the age of 15. He went on to be a composer of musicals, choral music, and music for television, as well as presenting music-based programmes for television and radio, for which he has won a number of awards.

Members
The main members of the band were:

 Howard Goodall – keyboards & vocals
 Jonathan Kermode – keyboards & vocals

Additional notable musicians who played with the band included:

Ray Cooper – percussion
Frank Gibson – drums
Laurence Juber – guitar
John Mealing – keyboards
Alan Parker – guitar
Henry Spinetti – drums

Discography
Albums
 Half Brother (LP) – Ariola Hansa (AHAL 8002) – 1978		
Singles
 "Holding Hands With Love" (7") – Ariola Hansa (AHA 515) – 1978			
 "Hideaway" (7", Single) – Ariola Hansa (AHA 534) & Hansa International (100 443-100) – 1979

References

Musical groups with year of establishment missing
Musical groups with year of disestablishment missing
English pop rock music groups
Musical groups from Oxford